George Reilly (born 14 September 1957) is a Scottish former footballer. He played for Corby Town, Northampton Town, Cambridge United, Watford, Newcastle United and West Bromwich Albion. Reilly scored the winning goal for Watford against Plymouth Argyle in the 1984 FA Cup semi-final at Villa Park and played in the 1984 FA Cup Final itself.  In 2003, nearly 20 years later, Reilly was working as a bricklayer on a building site in Corby when he was attacked by another worker who bit part of his right ear off, before whispering "Plymouth" in his other ear by way of explanation.

References

External links
 Past Players – George Reilly Cambridge United F.C. Official Site

Living people
1957 births
Scottish footballers
Cambridge United F.C. players
Newcastle United F.C. players
Northampton Town F.C. players
Watford F.C. players
West Bromwich Albion F.C. players
Association football forwards
FA Cup Final players